Gerard of Clairvaux may refer to:

Gerard of Clairvaux (died 1138), brother of Bernard of Clairvaux, recognized as a saint
Gerard of Clairvaux (died 1177), abbot of Clairvaux (as Gerard I), recognized as a martyr
Gerard of Clairvaux (died 1286), abbot of Clairvaux (as Gerard II)